Roger Yates (1905 - 2 September 1975)  was a pipe organ builder based initially in Nottingham and then Bodmin who flourished between 1928 and 1972.

Background

He was born in 1905, the son of James Yates and his wife Helen. He was educated at Tonbridge School. 

His career as an organ builder started in 1922 with an apprenticeship with Henry Willis & Sons and Lewis & Company Ltd in London, 

In 1928 he Roger Yates purchased the business of Charles Francis Lloyd in Nottingham, and he remained in Nottingham until 1937.

He then transferred to Bodmin, Cornwall. After service in the Royal Navy during World War II he moved to the Old Rectory, Michaelstowe, Cornwall and his business flourished until illness in 1972.

Noted instruments
1926 St. Andrew's Church, Nottingham addition of a Tuba 
1930 Front Street Methodist Church, Nottingham 
1930 Congregational Church, Nottingham 
1930 Methodist Church Wysall, Nottinghamshire
1930 Masonic Hall, 25 Goldsmith Street, Nottingham
1930 Addison Street Congregational Church, Nottingham (rebuild) 
1932 Dolmetsch Foundation, Haslemere, Surrey  
1934 St Mary the Virgin, Ilkeston, Derbyshire 
1934 Park Hill Congregational Church, Derby Road, Nottingham 
1936/37 Radcliffe-on-Trent, A.E. Allen Esq., 'Meadowcroft' (private residence)
1936 St. Peter's Church, Ruddington, Nottinghamshire
1937 St Peter's Church, East Bridgford, Nottinghamshire
1937 St Leonard, Glapthorn, Northamptonshire 
1937 All Saints' Church, Oakham, Rutland 
1939 St Mary, Bozeat, Northamptonshire 
1939 Good Shepherd, Romford, Essex 
1948 Church of St. John the Evangelist, Carrington
1948 St. Catharine's Church, Nottingham now at St. Peter and St. Paul's Church, Shelford
1950 St. Paul's Church, Daybrook, Nottingham 
1952 St Catharine, Gloucester
1953 St Andrew, Kegworth, Leicestershire
1958 St James the Great, Kilkhampton, Cornwall
1962 All Saints, Ulcombe, Kent 
1962 St Michael, Newquay, Cornwall  
1963-64 St John the Evangelist, Taunton  
1965-66 St Catherine, Gloucester 
1969 Dartington College of Arts, Devon 
1969-1972 Church of St Andrew, Stogursey, Somerset

References

British pipe organ builders
People educated at Tonbridge School
1905 births
1975 deaths